is a Japanese manga series written and illustrated by Akiko Higashimura. It was serialized in Kodansha's  manga magazine Kiss from March 2014 to April 2017 and later collected in nine bound volumes. It is licensed for an English-language release by Kodansha USA. The manga won the Eisner Award for Best U.S. Edition of International Material—Asia in 2019.

A 10-episode live-action television drama series adaptation was broadcast on Nippon TV from January to March 2017. It was followed by a two-hour television special in October 2020. The manga also inspired three spin-off manga series written and illustrated by Higashimura and serialized in Kiss magazine: Tarare-Bar (2017–2018), Tokyo Tarareba Girls Returns (2018), and Tokyo Tarareba Girls Season 2 (2019–2021). The second spin-off, Tokyo Tarareba Girls Returns, is licensed for an English-language release by Kodansha USA.

Plot
Rinko, a screenwriter living in Tokyo, remains unmarried at 33 years old. She has not been satisfied in love or at work and often goes out drinking with Kaori and Koyuki, her best friends since high school. One day, while the three women are dining and drinking at an izakaya as usual, complaining about the men they have dated, a mysterious and handsome young man with blond hair named Key tells them that they remain unmarried because they are always talking about "If I had done..." or "If he had been...". After hearing this, Rinko makes up her mind to get married by 2020, the year of the Tokyo Olympic Games.

Characters

Portrayed by: Yuriko Yoshitaka

Portrayed by: Nana Eikura

Portrayed by: Yuko Oshima
 / 
Portrayed by: Kentaro Sakaguchi

Portrayed by: Ryohei Suzuki

Portrayed by: Yūta Hiraoka

Portrayed by: Ren Ishikawa

Portrayed by: Akio Kaneda

Portrayed by: Kei Tanaka

Media

Manga
Written and illustrated by Akiko Higashimura, Tokyo Tarareba Girls was serialized in Kodansha's  manga magazine Kiss from the May 2014 issue (released on March 24, 2014) to the June 2017 issue (released on April 25, 2017). Kodansha collected the individual chapters in nine  volumes published from September 2014 to July 2017.

Kodansha USA licensed the manga for an English-language release in North America. It was first released digitally in February 2017, and later published in print from June 2018 to October 2019.

Spin-offs
Tokyo Tarareba Girls inspired three spin-off manga series, also written and illustrated by Akiko Higashimura.

The first manga series, titled , features Tara and Reba—the talking codfish milt and liver mascots from Rinko's fantasies—running a bar and giving relationship advice in response to reader-submitted questions. It was serialized in Kodansha's  manga magazine Kiss from the December 2017 issue (released on October 25, 2017) to the February 2019 issue (released on December 25, 2018). Kodansha collected the 10 chapters in a single  volume published on March 13, 2019.

The second manga series, titled , follows the lives of Rinko, Kaori, and Koyuki after the events of Tokyo Tarareba Girls. It was serialized in Kiss from the December 2018 issue (released on October 25, 2018) to the February 2019 issue (released on December 25, 2018). Kodansha collected the three chapters in a single  volume published on March 13, 2019. At their 2019 Anime NYC panel, Kodansha USA announced they licensed the series for an English-language release, to be made available digitally on December 24, 2019. The volume was delayed and instead released on October 6, 2020.

The third manga series, titled , follows a new cast of characters and is centered on 30-year-old Reina Hirota, a single, part-time librarian who lives with her parents. It was serialized in Kiss from the June 2019 issue (released on April 25, 2019) to the November 2021 issue (released on September 25, 2021). Kodansha collected the series in six  volumes published from October 11, 2019, to November 12, 2021.

Live-action
A 10-episode live-action television drama series adaptation of Tokyo Tarareba Girls was broadcast on Nippon TV from January 18 to March 22, 2017. The series was directed by Seiichi Nagumo, Yuma Suzuki, and Naoko Komuro, and written by Yūko Matsuda. It starred Yuriko Yoshitaka as Rinko, Nana Eikura as Kaori, Yuko Oshima as Koyuki, and Kentaro Sakaguchi as Key. Its opening theme song was "Tokyo Girl" by J-pop girl group Perfume. The series was released on DVD and Blu-ray in Japan on August 2, 2017.

A two-hour television special, titled , aired on Nippon TV on October 7, 2020. It was also directed by Yuma Suzuki and written by Yūko Matsuda, with the cast of the 2017 television drama series returning to reprise their roles.

Reception
Volume 2 of Tokyo Tarareba Girls reached the 5th place on the weekly Oricon manga chart and, as of May 24, 2015, had sold 95,639 copies; volume 3 reached the 17th place on the chart and, as of August 23, 2015, had sold 110,632 copies; volume 4 reached the 12th place and, as of December 20, 2015, had sold 114,433 copies; volume 5 reached the 6th place and, as of May 29, 2016, had sold 157,244 copies; volume 6 reached the 4th place and, as of September 18, 2016, had sold 112,865 copies; volume 7 reached the 1st place and, as of January 21, 2017, had sold 73,574 copies.

The series ranked number two on the 2015  Top 20 Manga for Female Readers survey, and was again number two on the same list the following year. Kadokawa Media Factory's book and manga news magazine Da Vinci ranked the series number 19 on its 2017 Book of the Year list.

Tokyo Tarareba Girls was nominated for the 9th Manga Taishō in 2016, finishing in ninth place with 29 points. It was also nominated for Best General Manga at the 40th Kodansha Manga Awards in 2016. It won an Eisner Award in the category Best U.S. Edition of International Material—Asia in 2019.

References

External links
Official manga website at Kiss 
Tokyo Tarareba Girls at Kodansha USA
Official drama series website at Nippon TV 
Official TV special website at Nippon TV 

2017 Japanese television series debuts
2017 Japanese television series endings
Comics set in Tokyo
Eisner Award winners
Japanese romantic comedy television series
Japanese television dramas based on manga
Josei manga
Kodansha manga
Manga adapted into television series
Nippon TV dramas
Romantic comedy anime and manga
Women in Tokyo